HMS Hound was a reciprocating engine-powered  built for the Royal Navy during the Second World War. She survived the war and was scrapped in 1962.

Design and description
The ships' complement consisted of 85 officers and ratings.

The reciprocating ships had two vertical triple-expansion steam engines, each driving one shaft, using steam provided by two Admiralty three-drum boilers.

The Algerine class was armed with a QF  Mk V anti-aircraft gun and four twin-gun mounts for Oerlikon 20 mm cannon. The latter guns were in short supply when the first ships were being completed and they often got a proportion of single mounts. By 1944, single-barrel Bofors 40 mm mounts began replacing the twin 20 mm mounts on a one for one basis. All of the ships were fitted for four throwers and two rails for depth charges.

Construction and career
She was laid down on 2 December 1941 at Lobnitz & Co, Renfrew, and launched on 29 July 1942.  The ship was commissioned on 11 December 1942, and eventually scrapped on 1 September 1962.

References

Bibliography

External links
 HMS Hound at battleships-cruisers.co.uk
  HMS Hound at uboat.net

 

1942 ships
Algerine-class minesweepers of the Royal Navy